James McCafferty (November 1900 – March 1981), sometimes known as Joe McCafferty, was a Scottish professional football outside forward who played in the Football League for Halifax Town, Gillingham and Brentford.

Career statistics

References

1900 births
Scottish footballers
English Football League players
Brentford F.C. players
Association football outside forwards
1981 deaths
Motherwell F.C. players
Scottish Football League players
Halifax Town A.F.C. players
Gillingham F.C. players
Wishaw Juniors F.C. players
Larkhall Thistle F.C. players
Duntocher Hibernian F.C. players
Vale of Leithen F.C. players